Charles Robert Brookins (September 17, 1899 – August 15, 1960) was an American track and field athlete who competed in the 1924 Summer Olympics. He was born in Oskaloosa, Iowa and died in Des Moines, Iowa.

He attended the University of Iowa and ran track in college. 1923 and 1925 Brookins won the 220 yard low hurdles at the USA Outdoor Track and Field Championships. Per the 1971 IAAF World Athletics booklet, "Progressive World Record Lists" Brookins set the world record in the 220 yard low hurdles (straight) with a 23.2 (June 2, 1923) and 23.0 (May 17, 1924). In 1924, he was disqualified in the 400 metre hurdles final at the Paris Olympics. He finished second in this race but was disqualified when ran out of his lane.

References

External links
 

1899 births
1960 deaths
American male hurdlers
Olympic track and field athletes of the United States
Athletes (track and field) at the 1924 Summer Olympics
People from Oskaloosa, Iowa